Erbil Polytechnic University is a public polytechnic university in Erbil, Kurdistan founded in 1996. The university is recognized by the Ministry of Higher Education and Scientific Research, Kurdistan Regional Government.

Colleges and Institutes

Colleges
Erbil Administrative Technical College
Erbil Engineering Technical College
Hawler Health Technical College

Institutes
Choman Technical Institute
Erbil Administrative Technical Institute
Erbil Medical Technical Institute
Erbil Technology Institute
Khabat Technical Institute
Koya Technical Institute
Shaqlawa Technical Institute
Soran Technical Institute

References

External links

Official website 
Official website 

Erbil
Educational institutions established in 1996
Education in Iraq
Educational organizations based in Iraq
1996 establishments in Iraq